The Scottish Painters' Society was a trade union representing painters and decorators in Scotland.

The union was founded in 1898, as the Scottish National Federation of House and Ship Painters.  By the end of the year, it had 1,227 members, and by 1900 this had risen to more than 3,000.  Around this date, if became the Scottish Amalgamated Society of House and Ship Painters, then in 1903, it simplified its name, becoming the "Scottish Painters' Society".

The union merged into the Amalgamated Society of Painters and Decorators in 1963.

General Secretaries
1899: Archibald Gardner
1924: Dugald McLean
1945: William Peat
1962: A. Black

References

Painters' and decorators' trade unions
Defunct trade unions of Scotland
Trade unions established in 1898
Trade unions disestablished in 1963